WJTE-LP (98.5 FM) is a radio station licensed to East Bernstadt, Kentucky, United States, broadcasting a Southern gospel format. The station is currently owned by The Light of London.

Current Programming
WJTE airs a mix of current and classic southern gospel and Christian country music, along with some lighter Contemporary Christian music. In 2018, the station launched a miniseries called "Spotlight On Laurel: Her History And Her People", an oral history collection featuring interviews with prominent residents who have made an impact on the community.

References

External links
 Official website
 

JTE-LP
Radio stations established in 2004
2004 establishments in Kentucky
Southern Gospel radio stations in the United States
JTE-LP
Laurel County, Kentucky